Daniele Invincibile (born 31 March 1979) is a retired Australian footballer who is head coach of Thai League 3 side Samut Prakan FC.

Club career
Born in Brisbane, Invincibile attended Payne Road Primary School, Brisbane, Australia. His clubs in Australia included The Gap, Taringa Rovers, Brisbane Strikers and the Marconi Stallions. He was selected in the Australian under-20s team and was a member of the Queensland Academy of Sport.

Swindon Town
Invincibile joined Swindon Town on 29 July 2000 after being spotted by manager Colin Todd while playing in a trial match alongside Gary Alexander for West Ham United. In April 2001, his injury-time winner against Peterborough United effectively saved Swindon from relegation in the 2000–01 season. He scored 25 goals in league and cup competitions while at the club.

Kilmarnock

On 24 July 2003, Invincibile was signed as a free agent by Jim Jefferies on a one-year deal. He was troubled by injuries in his first season, but went on to make 21 appearances and score five goals. He played the roles of winger or striker, and wore the number 11 shirt.

In April 2006, Invincibile turned down the chance to return to the Australian National League by refusing an offer from A-League team Melbourne Victory.

In November 2006, he helped Kilmarnock into the semi-finals of the CIS Insurance League Cup by curling home the winner in a 3–2 victory over Motherwell.

In the final league match of the 2008–09 season, Invincibile scored the opening goal for Kilmarnock in the away match against Motherwell, and he finished with 8 goals for the season

On 31 January 2011, it was reported that Kilmarnock had released Invincibile from his contract.

St Johnstone

On 25 February 2011, he joined St Johnstone on a short-term contract.

Army United
In January 2012, he joined Thai Premier League team Army United.

International career

On 26 August 2009, Invincibile was named in the Australian squad for a friendly against South Korea, which was played on 5 September in Seoul, South Korea.

Career statistics

Managerial statistics

References

External links

Kilmarnock FC profile
OzFootball profile

1979 births
Living people
Soccer players from Brisbane
Italian people of Australian descent
Australian people of Italian descent
Sportspeople of Italian descent
Association football midfielders
Brisbane Strikers FC players
Marconi Stallions FC players
Swindon Town F.C. players
Kilmarnock F.C. players
St Johnstone F.C. players
Ermis Aradippou FC players
Danny Invincibile
National Soccer League (Australia) players
English Football League players
Scottish Premier League players
Cypriot First Division players
Danny Invincibile
Australian expatriate soccer players
Australian expatriate sportspeople in England
Australian expatriate sportspeople in Scotland
Australian expatriate sportspeople in Cyprus
Australian expatriate sportspeople in Thailand
Expatriate footballers in England
Expatriate footballers in Scotland
Expatriate footballers in Cyprus
Expatriate footballers in Thailand
Australian soccer players